Peen may refer to:
 Part of the head of a hammer, as in a ball-peen hammer (also ball-pein, or ball and pein)
 Peening, the changing of a metal's properties by impacting its surface
 Shot peening, bombarding metal parts with small spherical media
 Laser peening, focusing lasers on the surface of a metal part
 Peening (scythe blade), peening a scythe or sickle blade as a step in sharpening it
 Steel Belt: Shot Peening, an innovative remedial solution for deformed steel belts
A slang term for the penis

See also
Peene (disambiguation)
 Pein
 Peen tong, a Chinese brown sugar and sugar candy